Paul Giroud (6 June 1898 – 21 January 1989) was a French physician and biologist.

Biography
 
Born in Munet (Moulins), Allier, France he studied and worked at the Institut Pasteur in Paris.

Giroud was Head of Laboratory at the Institut Pasteur in Paris from 1930 to 1938. During these years he carried out several missions in Tunisia to research the source of typhus. 
Meanwhile, he also travelled to the USSR, where he met Vladimir Barykin, who had developed a method of cultivating the agent of typhus for the preparation of a vaccine.
In 1940 Giroud together with René Panthier developed a vaccine against typhus. After this discovery Giroud studied the rickettsioses in Congo, Rwanda, Kenya and Ethiopia. He also worked on a vaccine against Rocky Mountain spotted fever.

In 1956 he was elected member of the Académie de Médecine and in 1971 promoted to Commander of the Legion of Honour in the biological science section.

References

External links
 Biography at pathexo.fr
 Biography at Institut Pasteur

1898 births
1989 deaths
People from Allier
People from Moulins, Allier
Académie Nationale de Médecine
20th-century French biologists
20th-century French physicians